Handroanthus albus, the golden trumpet tree, is a tree with yellow flowers native to Argentina, Paraguay, Bolivia and the Cerrado (tropical savannas) of Brazil, where it is known as .

This plant is found in the Brazilian states of  Distrito Federal, where it's the states symbol, Bahia, Espírito Santo, Goiás, Mato Grosso do Sul, Minas Gerais, Paraná, Rio de Janeiro, Rio Grande do Sul, Santa Catarina, Piauí, Amazonas, Pará and São Paulo.

It is used as an urban tree.  Well-known and popular, the tree and its flower are the national plants of Brazil.

References

albus
Endemic flora of Brazil
Trees of Brazil
Flora of the Cerrado
Taxa named by Adelbert von Chamisso
Garden plants of South America
Ornamental trees